Marjorie Kinnan Rawlings Historic State Park is a Florida State Park and historic site located on the former homestead of Pulitzer Prize-winning Florida author Marjorie Kinnan Rawlings (1896-1953). A National Historic Landmark, it is located in Cross Creek, Florida, between Ocala and Gainesville at 18700 South County Road 325.

Setting
Marjorie Kinnan Rawlings Historic State Park is located on the eastern shore of Orange Lake, a short way south of the village of Cross Creek. A public parking area and boat ramp are located south of the house, gardens, and outbuildings of the Rawlings home. The home is a rambling single-story wood-frame structure, whose central core is a dogtrot house dating to the 19th century. Other buildings include a pump house, barn, and a small tenant house. Of these, only the pump house is also of 19th-century origin.

History
Marjorie Kinnan Rawlings, a native of Washington, DC, and her husband Charles purchased a  orange grove in 1929, including the old dogtrot house.  They set about enlarging and adapting the house to their use, and both developed their careers as writers.  Marjorie first achieved significant notice with stories published in Scribner's Magazine, and was awarded the Pulitzer Prize in 1939 for The Yearling.  Her writing was infused with details from the central Florida region where she made her home.

Upon her death in 1953, the property was bequeathed to a foundation of the University of Florida.  It has been managed by the state ever since, the house opening to the public in 1970.

Park activities
Activities include hiking and hourly tours Thursday through Sunday, at 10 a.m. 11 a.m. and from 1 p.m. to 4 p.m., except in August and September. Amenities include two short hiking trails and park employees that bring 1930s rural Florida to life with period clothing and stories. In addition, guests are invited to pick and sample oranges from the many trees within the property.

Florida state parks are open between 8 a.m. and sundown every day of the year (including holidays). The cost is $3 per car to enter the park.

See also
List of National Historic Landmarks in Florida
National Register of Historic Places listings in Alachua County, Florida
Florida State Parks in Alachua County

References

External links
Marjorie Kinnan Rawlings Historic State Park at Florida State Parks
Marjorie Kinnan Rawlings State Historic Site at Wildernet
Alachua County listings at Florida's Office of Cultural and Historical Programs
Marjorie Kinnan Rawlings Historic State Park at Historic Homes of Greater Gainesville

State parks of Florida
Houses on the National Register of Historic Places in Florida
National Historic Landmarks in Florida
National Register of Historic Places in Alachua County, Florida
Museums in Alachua County, Florida
Historic house museums in Florida
Farm museums in Florida
Biographical museums in Florida
Literary museums in the United States
Women's museums in the United States
Protected areas established in 1970
Parks in Alachua County, Florida
Houses in Alachua County, Florida
Historic American Buildings Survey in Florida
1970 establishments in Florida
Houses completed in 1890